Arbacia crassispina is a species of sea urchin of the family Arbaciidae. Its armour is covered with spines. A. crassispina was first scientifically described in 1910 by Ole Theodor Jensen Mortensen.

See also 
 Araeosoma thetidis
 Araeosoma violaceum
 Arbacia dufresnii

References 

Arbacioida
Animals described in 1910
Taxa named by Ole Theodor Jensen Mortensen